The Max Planck Institute for Informatics (German: Max-Planck-Institut für Informatik, abbreviated MPI-INF or MPII) is a research institute in computer science with a focus on algorithms and their applications in a broad sense. It hosts fundamental research (algorithms and complexity, programming logics) as well a research for various application domains (computer graphics, geometric computation, constraint solving, computational biology). It is part of the Max-Planck-Gesellschaft, Germany's largest publicly funded body for foundation research.

Research departments 

As of early 2018 the institute had five directors, called scientific members. These are:

 Kurt Mehlhorn - algorithms and complexity department
 Bernt Schiele - computer vision and multimodal computing department
 Thomas Lengauer - computational biology and applied algorithmics department
 Anja Feldmann - Internet architecture department
 Hans-Peter Seidel - computer graphics department
 Gerhard Weikum - databases and information systems department

In addition to the departments, the institute hosts the research group on automation of logic, lead  by Christoph Weidenbach. The programming logics department was, until his death in 2004, led by Harald Ganzinger. The independent research group on computational genomics and epidemiology was led by Alice McHardy.

The institute, along with the Max Planck Institute for Software Systems (MPI-SWS), the German Research Centre for Artificial Intelligence (DFKI) and the entire Computer Science department of Saarland University, is involved in the Internationales Begegnungs- und Forschungszentrum für Informatik.

The International Max Planck Research School for Computer Science (IMPRS-CS) is the graduate school of the MPII and the MPI-SWS. It was founded in 2000 and offers a fully funded PhD-Program in cooperation with Saarland University. Dean is Gerhard Weikum.

See also 
 Max Planck Institute for Software Systems
 YAGO (database) (developed at the Max Planck Institute for Computer Science)

References

External links 
 Max Planck Institute for Informatics Homepage
 International Meeting Place and Research Centre for Computer Science in Dagstuhl Castle
 International Max Planck Research School for Computer Science